Baron Rotherwick, of Tylney in the County of Southampton, is a title in the Peerage of the United Kingdom.

History 
The title was created on 8 June 1939 for the shipping magnate and Conservative Member of Parliament, Sir Herbert Cayzer, 1st Baronet.

He had previously represented Portsmouth South in the House of Commons.

Before his elevation to the peerage, he had been created a baronet, of Tylney in the County of Southampton, on 29 January 1924.

Cayzer was the fifth son of Sir Charles Cayzer, 1st Baronet, of Gartmore and the younger brother of Sir August Cayzer, 1st Baronet, of Roffey Park.  the titles are held by the first Baron's grandson, the third Baron, who succeeded his father in 1996. He was one of the 92 elected hereditary peers that remain in the House of Lords after the passing of the House of Lords Act of 1999, and sat on the Conservative benches. He resigned on 1 February 2022. Lord Rotherwick also succeeded to the Cayzer Baronetcy of Gartmore on the death of Sir James Arthur Cayzer, 5th Baronet on 27 February 2012.

The family seat is Cornbury Park, near Charlbury, Oxfordshire.

Barons Rotherwick (1939)
Herbert Robin Cayzer, 1st Baron Rotherwick (1881–1958)
Herbert Robin Cayzer, 2nd Baron Rotherwick (1912–1996)
(Herbert) Robin Cayzer, 3rd Baron Rotherwick (b. 1954)

The heir apparent is the present holder's son Hon. Herbert Robin Cayzer (b. 1989)
The heir apparent's heir apparent is his son Herbert Robin Cayzer (b. 2017)

See also
Cayzer baronets

Notes

References
Kidd, Charles, Williamson, David (editors). Debrett's Peerage and Baronetage (1990 edition). New York: St Martin's Press, 1990, 

Baronies in the Peerage of the United Kingdom
Noble titles created in 1939
Noble titles created for UK MPs
Rotherwick